Another Night may refer to:
Another Night (Real McCoy album), a 1995 album by Real McCoy
"Another Night" (song), the title song of that album
Another Night (The Hollies album), a 1975 album by The Hollies
"Se på mej", a song by the Swedish singer Jan Johansen, recorded in English as "Another Night"
"Another Night", 1986 single by Aretha Franklin from the album Who's Zoomin' Who?
"Another Night", 1990 single by Jason Donovan from the album Between the Lines
"Another Night", 1976 song from the Camel album Moonmadness
"Another Night", 1982 song from the Bucks Fizz album Are You Ready
"Another Night", 2010 song from the Mac Miller EP, On and On and Beyond